Alexander "Alec" Tzannes  (born December 27, 1950) is an Australian architect and academic. He has taught at a number of Australian universities, including at the University of New South Wales as Dean of the University's Faculty of Built Environment from 2008 to 2016. He is also the founding director of Tzannes Associates, an architecture and design practice.

Education 
He studied architecture and science at the University of Sydney, where he graduated in 1974. He later studied in a postgraduate capacity at Columbia University, where he graduated in 1978.

Career 
Tzannes has taught at a number of Australian universities, including as a Visiting Professorial Fellow at the Queensland University of Technology in 2003. He is currently a Professor of Design Practice in Built Environment at the University of New South Wales, having previously served as Dean of the University's Faculty of Built Environment from 2008 to 2016. He is also the founding director of Tzannes Associates, an architecture and design practice.

Tzannes designed the Federation Pavilion in Centennial Park, New South Wales, which was erected in 1988, during the Australian Bicentenary. The site was previously used to mark the Federation of Australia during the official ceremony on 1 January 1901.

Awards 
He was made a member of the Order of Australia in 2014 for 'significant service to architecture, as a practitioner and educator, and through professional organisations'. In 2018 he was awarded the Australian Institute of Architects’ Gold Medal. In 2019 the Hellenic Union of Eptanisians honoured Tzannes for his academic and architectural work. A stamp was issued in recognition of this honour by the Hellenic Post.

References

External links 
 Tzannes Associates

1950 births
Living people
New South Wales architects
Columbia Graduate School of Architecture, Planning and Preservation alumni
Members of the Order of Australia
Recipients of the Royal Australian Institute of Architects’ Gold Medal